Abdul Awal Mia was a Bangladesh Awami League politician and the former Member of Parliament of Kushtia-4.

Career
Mia was elected to parliament from Kushtia-4 as a Bangladesh Awami League candidate in 1991. The party denied him their nomination in 1996, choosing elder statesman Abul Hossain Tarun instead. Mia worked against Tarun, and the party blamed him for Tarun's narrow loss to Bangladesh Nationalist Party candidate Syed Mehedi Ahmed Rumi. Mia left the Awami League in January 2001. He joined the Jatiya Party (Ershad), and contested the seat again in 2008, but finished a distant third.

Death
Mia died on 11 April 2014 in Moghbazar, Dhaka, Bangladesh from liver cancer.

References

Awami League politicians
2014 deaths
5th Jatiya Sangsad members